Naohiro Dōgakinai (June 2, 1914 – February 2, 2004) was the 3rd Governor of Hokkaido (1971–1983). He was member of the Liberal Democratic Party, and originally from Sapporo.

Awards
Order of the Sacred Treasure, 1st class, 1988

Literature
『北海道道路史』（共著、北海道道路史調査会、1990年）

Bibliography
北海道新聞社 - 北の隣人・日ソ国交回復30周年(1986年)
日外アソシエーツ編『20世紀日本人名辞典』（紀伊国屋書店）

1914 births
2004 deaths
Japanese politicians
Governors of Hokkaido
People from Sapporo